Mohamed Almamy Camara (born 27 March 1996) is a Guinean footballer who plays as a forward for Swiss side YF Juventus.

Career statistics

Club

Notes

References

1996 births
Living people
Sportspeople from Conakry
Guinean footballers
Association football forwards
Championnat National 3 players
Swiss 1. Liga (football) players
2. Liga (Austria) players
Swiss Promotion League players
RC Strasbourg Alsace players
SR Delémont players
SV Horn players
SC Young Fellows Juventus players
Guinean expatriate footballers
Guinean expatriate sportspeople in France
Expatriate footballers in France
Guinean expatriate sportspeople in Switzerland
Expatriate footballers in Switzerland
Guinean expatriate sportspeople in Austria
Expatriate footballers in Austria